Watch on the Rhine (German:Die Wacht am Rhein or Aus des Rheinlands Schicksalstagen) is a 1926 German silent historical film directed by Helene Lackner and starring Hans Mierendorff, Ernst Winar and Gustav Adolf Semler.

The film's art direction was by Karl Machus.

Plot summary

Cast

References

Bibliography
 Quinlan, David. The Illustrated Directory of Film Stars. Hippocrene Books, 1981.

External links

1926 films
Films of the Weimar Republic
German silent feature films
German black-and-white films
German historical films
1920s historical films
1920s German films